Karol Jakubowicz (died 28 April 2013) was a Polish academic who studied journalism and communication science. He was instrumental in guiding the development of media legislation in eastern Europe in the 1990s.

References

2013 deaths
Polish academics